The UEFA Futsal Euro 2018 qualifying competition was a men's futsal competition that determined the 11 teams joining the automatically qualified hosts Slovenia in the UEFA Futsal Euro 2018 final tournament.

A total of 47 UEFA member national teams entered the qualifying competition (including Germany and Kosovo who entered for the first time).

Format
The qualifying competition consists of three rounds:
Preliminary round: The 26 lowest-ranked teams are drawn into five groups of four teams and two groups of three teams. Each group is played in single round-robin format at one of the teams which were pre-selected as hosts. The seven group winners advance to the main round.
Main round: The 28 teams (21 highest-ranked teams and seven preliminary round qualifiers) are drawn into seven groups of four teams. Each group is played in single round-robin format at one of the teams which were pre-selected as hosts. The seven group winners qualify for the final tournament, while the seven runners-up and the best third-placed team advanced to the play-offs.
Play-offs: The eight teams are drawn into four ties to play home-and-away two-legged matches to determine the last four qualified teams.

Tiebreakers
In the preliminary round and main round, teams are ranked according to points (3 points for a win, 1 point for a draw, 0 points for a loss), and if tied on points, the following tiebreaking criteria are applied, in the order given, to determine the rankings (Regulations Articles 14.01 and 14.02):
Points in head-to-head matches among tied teams;
Goal difference in head-to-head matches among tied teams;
Goals scored in head-to-head matches among tied teams;
If more than two teams are tied, and after applying all head-to-head criteria above, a subset of teams are still tied, all head-to-head criteria above are reapplied exclusively to this subset of teams;
Goal difference in all group matches;
Goals scored in all group matches;
Penalty shoot-out if only two teams have the same number of points, and they met in the last round of the group and are tied after applying all criteria above (not used if more than two teams have the same number of points, or if their rankings are not relevant for qualification for the next stage);
Disciplinary points (red card = 3 points, yellow card = 1 point, expulsion for two yellow cards in one match = 3 points);
UEFA coefficient;
Drawing of lots.

To determine the best third-placed team from the main round, the following criteria are applied (Regulations Article 15.01):
Points;
Goal difference;
Goals scored;
Disciplinary points;
UEFA coefficient;
Drawing of lots.

In the play-offs, the team that scores more goals on aggregate over the two legs qualifies for the final tournament. If the aggregate score is level, the away goals rule is applied, i.e., the team that scores more goals away from home over the two legs advances. If away goals are also equal, extra time is played. The away goals rule is again applied after extra time, i.e., if there are goals scored during extra time and the aggregate score is still level, the visiting team advances by virtue of more away goals scored. If no goals are scored during extra time, the tie is decided by penalty shoot-out (Regulations Article 20.01).

Schedule
The qualifying matches are played on the following dates.

Entrants
The teams were ranked according to their coefficient ranking, calculated based on the following:
UEFA Futsal Euro 2014 final tournament and qualifying competition
UEFA Futsal Euro 2016 final tournament and qualifying competition
2016 FIFA Futsal World Cup final tournament and qualifying competition

The 21 highest-ranked teams entered the main round, while the 26 lowest-ranked teams entered the preliminary round. The coefficient ranking was also used for seeding in the preliminary round and main round draws, where each team was assigned a seeding position according to their ranking for the respective draw, with seven teams each pre-selected as hosts for the preliminary round and the main round (marked by (H) below).

Notes
Teams marked in bold have qualified for the final tournament.

The draws for the preliminary round and main round were held on 21 October 2016, 14:30 CEST (UTC+2), at the UEFA headquarters in Nyon, Switzerland. The mechanism of the draws for each round was as follows:
In the preliminary round, the 26 teams were drawn into seven groups: five groups of four containing one team from each of the seeding positions 1–4, and two groups of three containing one team from each of the seeding positions 1–3. First, the seven teams which were pre-selected as hosts were drawn from their own designated pot and allocated to their respective group as per their seeding positions. Next, the remaining 19 teams were drawn from their respective pot which were allocated according to their seeding positions.
In the main round, the 28 teams were drawn into seven groups of four, containing one team from each of the seeding positions 1–3 and one group winner from the preliminary round. First, the seven teams which were pre-selected as hosts were drawn from their own designated pot and allocated to their respective group as per their seeding positions. Next, the remaining 21 teams (including the seven preliminary round winners, whose identity was not known at the time of the draw) were drawn from their respective pot which were allocated according to their seeding positions.

Based on the decisions taken by the UEFA Emergency Panel, Azerbaijan/Armenia, Spain/Gibraltar, Kosovo/Serbia, and Kosovo/Bosnia and Herzegovina would not be drawn into the same group. Should any of the above teams win their preliminary round group and qualify for a main round group with a team they cannot play against, they would be swapped with the next available team in their seeding position following the alphabetical order of the groups.

Preliminary round
All times are CET (UTC+1).

Group A

Group B

Group C

Group D

Group E

Group F

Group G

Main round
All times are CEST (UTC+2).

Group 1
Note: Belarus were originally to host.

Group 2

Group 3

Group 4

Group 5

Group 6

Group 7

Ranking of third-placed teams

Play-offs
The draw for the play-offs was held on 6 July 2017, 13:30 CEST, at the UEFA headquarters in Nyon, Switzerland. There were no seedings, with the only restriction that the best third-placed team (Poland) could not be drawn against the runner-up from the same main round group (Serbia).

All times are CEST (UTC+2).

|}

Serbia won 8–7 on aggregate and qualified for the final tournament.

France won 6–5 on aggregate and qualified for the final tournament.

Romania won 9–6 on aggregate and qualified for the final tournament.

Poland won 7–6 on aggregate and qualified for the final tournament.

Qualified teams
The following 12 teams qualified for the final tournament.

1 Bold indicates champions for that year. Italic indicates hosts for that year.

Top goalscorers
The following players scored six goals or more in the qualifying competition:

9 goals

 Halim Selmanaj
 Archil Sebiskveradze

7 goals

 Artūrs Jerofejevs
 Bojan Bajović

6 goals

 Azem Brahimi
 Abdessamad Mohammed
 Sávio Valadares

References

External links

Qualifying
2018
Euro 2018 qualifying
Euro 2018 qualifying